Amargosa Valley (formerly Lathrop Wells) is an unincorporated town located on U.S. Route 95 in Nye County, in the U.S. state of Nevada.

Description
The community is named after the Amargosa River which flows through the valley from its origination in Nevada to its terminus in Death Valley, California. The name Amargosa Valley is used locally with reference to the actual geographic valley, although for the most part, it is coincident with the Amargosa Desert and is noted as such on many maps.

The populated area of the Amargosa Valley is sandwiched between US 95 to the north and the California border to the south. Some of the residential streets in the community cross over into California. Much of the Nevada-California border in this area is contiguous with the boundaries of Death Valley National Park.

History
The Tonopah and Tidewater Railroad ran through the valley from 1906 to 1940, for borax mining operations. Modern development did not begin until the early 1950s. Electric power, other than that produced by private generators, was not available until 1963. Until the early 1990s growth in Amargosa Valley was minimal. More recently, intense growth in Las Vegas has led many new residents to settle in Amargosa Valley and nearby Pahrump.

Geography
Amargosa Valley is located at 36.58001 North, 116.44487 West at an elevation of 2,640 feet (805 m) above sea level. The landscape is typical of lower to moderate elevations in the Mojave Desert, with flat expanses of sandy soil punctuated by rocky mounds and hills. Predominant indigenous vegetation is White Bursage and Creosote Bush, with some Joshua Trees and Cacti at higher elevations. Numerous non-native plant species have also been introduced.

Demographics

Recreation
Alien Cathouse is one of Nevada's legal brothels. It is located near the corner of U.S. 95 and SR 373. Longstreet Hotel, Casino, and RV Resort is a full-service hotel and casino with restaurants and a RV park. The hotel is located on SR 373, near the Nevada–California border. The hotel is popular with visitors to nearby Death Valley National Park. Big Dunes, popular for weekenders from all over Southern Nevada, is located on the north side of Amargosa Valley. Ash Meadows Wildlife Refuge is located in the southern end of Amargosa Valley.

References

External links
 Amargosa Valley Home Page – privately operated commercial site; not maintained by a government entity
 Amargosa Valley Library

1905 establishments in Nevada
Amargosa Desert
Populated places established in 1905
Populated places in the Mojave Desert
Tonopah and Tidewater Railroad
Unincorporated communities in Nye County, Nevada
Unincorporated towns in Nevada